Erik Hric (born 24 September 1997) is a Slovak footballer who currently plays for Prameň Kováčová as midfielder.

Club career

Dukla Banská Bystrica
Hric made his Fortuna Liga debut for Dukla Banská Bystrica on 6 March 2015 against Spartak Trnava.

References

External links
 Eurofotbal profile
 
 Futbalnet profile

1997 births
Living people
Sportspeople from Banská Bystrica
Slovak footballers
Slovakia youth international footballers
Association football midfielders
FK Dukla Banská Bystrica players
FK Železiarne Podbrezová players
MFK Lokomotíva Zvolen players
ŠK Prameň Kováčová players
Slovak Super Liga players
2. Liga (Slovakia) players
3. Liga (Slovakia) players